Choosing a Husband is a 1909 American short silent drama film directed by D. W. Griffith and starring Florence Barker. It is not known whether the film currently survives.

Plot
Gladys has four bachelors pursuing her. To prove their loyalty she plans fake duties to make them believe she is away every time the men visit her. During the visits each bachelor met her pretty young sister. Each one flirts with the young sister and fails the test.

Cast
 Florence Barker as Gladys
 Kate Bruce
 Charles Craig as Bachelor
 Anthony O'Sullivan as Bachelor
 Billy Quirk as Bachelor
 Mack Sennett as Bachelor
 Blanche Sweet as One of Gladys' Friends
 Henry B. Walthall as Harry
 Dorothy West as One of Gladys' Friends

See also
 List of American films of 1909
 D. W. Griffith filmography
 Blanche Sweet filmography

References

External links

1909 films
1900s comedy-drama films
1909 short films
American comedy-drama films
American silent short films
Biograph Company films
American black-and-white films
Films directed by D. W. Griffith
American comedy short films
1900s American films
Silent comedy-drama films
Silent American drama films
Silent American comedy films